The Let's-Read-and-Find-Out Science Books series, originally published by Crowell, now HarperCollins, is an American children's book series designed to educate preschoolers and young elementary school students about basic science concepts.

Many Let's Read and Find Out titles have either been reillustrated (sometimes more than once) or reissued under different titles. Some of these titles may be duplicates because of the renaming.

Early editions of the series included the following boilerplate:

A MESSAGE FROM ROMA GANS
Professor Emeritus of Childhood Education, Teachers College, Columbia University.
Children want to be up-to-date.
As a child reads or is read to, he feels himself stretch in importance. This is a feeling that each child should have in growing up. Let's-Read-and-Find-Out Science Books are designed to help him acquire this feeling. They are planned for the child who is eager to know.
LET'S-READ-AND-FIND-OUT SCIENCE BOOKS
 present basic science information
 are written with an understanding of how children think
 are brief enough for the young child to cope with
 are long enough to challenge him.

Since the 1990s, the series has been divided into two levels. Stage 1 books "explain simple and easily observable science concepts for preschool- and kindergarten-age children." Subjects covered in Stage 1 titles include the human body, plants, animals and "the world around us."  

Stage 2 books "explore more challenging concepts for children in the primary grades and include hands-on activities that children can do themselves." Subjects covered in the Stage 2 titles including the human body, plants, animals, dinosaurs, space, weather and the seasons, our earth and "the world around us."

Let's Read and Find Out Science book list

Lists of children's books
Science books
American children's books
Children's non-fiction books